is a former Japanese football player.

Playing career
Kazuma Inoue played for YSCC Yokohama from 2012 to 2015.

References

External links

1990 births
Living people
Tokai University alumni
Association football people from Kanagawa Prefecture
Japanese footballers
J3 League players
Japan Football League players
YSCC Yokohama players
Association football forwards